Hindustan Aeronautics Limited (HAL) is an Indian defence central public sector undertaking under the Ministry of Defence, Government of India, headquartered in Bangalore. Established on 23 December 1940, HAL is one of the oldest and largest aerospace and defence manufacturers in the world. HAL began aircraft manufacturing as early as 1942 with licensed production of Harlow PC-5, Curtiss P-36 Hawk and Vultee A-31 Vengeance for the Indian Air Force. HAL currently has 11 dedicated Research and Development (R&D) centers and 21 manufacturing divisions under 4 production units spread across India. HAL is managed by a board of directors appointed by the President of India through the Ministry of Defence, Government of India. HAL is currently involved in designing and manufacturing of fighter jets, helicopters, jet engine and marine gas turbine engine, avionics, software development, spares supply, overhauling and upgrading of Indian military aircraft. In June 22, 2007, the Government of India conferred Navaratna status to HAL. 

The HAL HF-24 Marut fighter-bomber was the first indigenous fighter aircraft made in India.

History

HAL was established as Hindustan Aircraft Limited in Bangalore on 23 December 1940 by Walchand Hirachand in association with the then Kingdom of Mysore. Walchand Hirachand became chairman of the company. The company's office was opened at a bungalow called "Eventide" on Domlur Road.

The organisation and equipment for the factory at Bangalore was set up by William D. Pawley of the Intercontinental Aircraft Corporation of New York. Pawley obtained a large number of machine-tools and equipment from the United States.

The Indian Government bought a one-third stake in the company and by April 1941 by investing ₹25 lakh as it believed this to be a strategic imperative. The decision by the government was primarily motivated to boost British military hardware supplies in Asia to counter the increasing threat posed by Imperial Japan during Second World War. The Kingdom of Mysore supplied two directors, Air Marshal John Higgins was resident director. The first aircraft built was a Harlow PC-5 On 2 April 1942, the government announced that the company had been nationalised when it had bought out the stakes of Seth Walchand Hirachand and other promoters so that it could act freely. The Mysore Kingdom refused to sell its stake in the company but yielded the management control over to the British Indian Government.

In 1943 the Bangalore factory was handed over to the United States Army Air Forces but still using Hindustan Aircraft management. The factory expanded rapidly and became the centre for major overhaul and repair of American aircraft and was known as the 84th Air Depot. The first aircraft to be overhauled was a Consolidated PBY Catalina followed by every type of aircraft operated in India and Burma. When returned to Indian control two years later the factory had become one of the largest overhaul and repair organisations in the East. In the post war reorganisation the company built railway carriages as an interim activity.

After India gained independence in 1947, the management of the company was passed over to the Government of India.

The total number of broad- gauge coaches manufactured by the Hindustan Aircraft Limited during the year 1954 is 158. 

Hindustan Aeronautics Limited (HAL) was formed on 1 October 1964 (the Registrar of Companies has a registration date of 16 August 1963) when Hindustan Aircraft Limited joined the consortium formed in June by the IAF Aircraft Manufacturing Depot, Kanpur (at the time manufacturing HS748 under licence) and the group recently set up to manufacture MiG-21 under licence, with its new factories planned in Koraput, Nasik and Hyderabad. Though HAL was not used actively for developing newer models of fighter jets, except for the HF-24 Marut, the company has played a crucial role in modernisation of the Indian Air Force. In 1957 company started manufacturing Bristol Siddeley Orpheus jet engines under licence at new factory located in Bangalore.

During the 1980s, HAL's operations saw a rapid increase which resulted in the development of new indigenous aircraft such as the HAL Tejas and HAL Dhruv. HAL also developed an advanced version of the Mikoyan-Gurevich MiG-21, known as MiG-21 Bison, which increased its life-span by more than 20 years. HAL has also obtained several multimillion-dollar contracts from leading international aerospace firms such as Airbus, Boeing and Honeywell to manufacture aircraft spare parts and engines.

By 2012, HAL was reportedly bogged down in the details of production and has been slipping on its schedules. On 1 April 2015, HAL reconstituted its Board with TS Raju as CMD, S Subrahmanyan as Director (Operations), VM Chamola as Director (HR), CA Ramana Rao as Director (Finance) and D K Venkatesh as Director (Engineering & R&D). There are two government nominees in the board and six independent directors.

In March 2017, HAL Chairman and Managing Director T Suvarna Raju announced that the company had finalised plans for an indigenisation drive. The company plans to produce nearly 1, 000 military helicopters, including Kamov 226, LCH (Light Combat Helicopter) ALH (Advanced Light Helicopter), and over 100 planes over the next 10 years. HAL will manufacture the Kamov 226T helicopter under a joint venture agreement with Russian defence manufacturers. The Kamov 226T will replace the country's fleet of Cheetah and Chetak helicopters. Over the next 5 years, HAL will carry out major upgrade of almost the entire fighter fleet of Indian Air Force including Su-30MKI, Jaguars, Mirage and Hawk jets to make them "more lethal". The company will also deliver 123 Tejas Light Combat Aircraft to the IAF from 2018 to 2019, at a rate of 16 jets per year. LCH production will now take place in a newly built Light Combat Helicopter Production Hangar at Helicopter Division in HAL Complex.

In view of Make in India policy and to increase the share of defence exports to achieve the target of $5 billion by 2025, HAL is planning to setup logistic bases in Indonesia, Malaysia, Sri Lanka and Vietnam with priority target for Southeast Asia, West Asia and North African markets. It would not only help to promote HAL products but also act as service centre for Soviet/Russian origin equipment.

Operations
One of the largest aerospace companies in Asia, HAL has annual turnover of over 3 billion. More than 40% of HAL's revenues come from international deals to manufacture aircraft engines, spare parts, and other aircraft materials. A partial list of major operations undertaken by HAL includes the following:

International agreements

 US$1 billion contract to manufacture aircraft parts for Boeing.
 120 RD-33MK turbofan engines to be manufactured for MiG-29K by HAL for US$250 million.
 Contract to manufacture 1,000 Honeywell TPE331 aircraft engines for Honeywell worth US$200,000 each (estimates put total value of deal at US$200 million).
 US$120 million deal to manufacture Dornier 228 for RUAG of Switzerland.
 Manufacture of aircraft parts for Airbus SAS worth US$150 million.
 US$100 million contract to export composite materials to Israel Aerospace Industries.
 US$65 million joint-research facility with Honeywell and planned production of Honeywell TPE331 engines.
 US$50.7 million contract to supply Advanced Light Helicopter to Ecuadorian Air Force. HAL will also open a maintenance base in the country.
 US$30 million contract to supply avionics for Malaysian Su-30MKM.
 US$20 million contract to supply ambulance version of HAL Dhruv to Peru.
 Contract of 3 HAL Dhruv helicopters for Turkey worth US$20 million.
 US$10 million order from Namibia for HAL Chetak and Cheetah helicopters.
 Supply of HAL Dhruv helicopters to Mauritius' National Police in a deal worth US$7 million.
 Unmanned helicopter development project with Israel Aerospace Industries.
US$15 million contract for supplying steel and nickel alloy forgings to GE Aviation for its global military and commercial engine programmes.

Domestic agreements
 221 Sukhoi Su-30MKI manufactured at HAL's facilities in Nasik, Koraput and Bangalore. The total contract, which also involves Russia's Sukhoi Aerospace, is worth 3.2 billion.
 200 HAL Light Combat Helicopters for the Indian Air Force and 500 HAL Dhruv helicopters worth US$5.83 billion.
 US$900 million aerospace hub in Shamshabad, Telangana.
 US$57 million upgrade of SEPECAT Jaguar fleet of the Indian Air Force.
 US$55 million helicopter simulator training facility in Bangalore in collaboration with Canada's CAE.
 64 MiG-29s to be upgraded by HAL and Russia's MiG Corporation in a programme worth US$960 million.
 Licensed production of 82 BAE Hawk 132.

Indigenous products

Over the years, HAL has designed and developed several platforms like the HF-24 Marut, the Dhruv, the LUH, and the LCH. HAL also manufactures indigenous products with technology transferred from the DRDO, in association with Bharat Electronics for its avionics and Indian Ordnance Factories for the on-board weapons systems and ammunition.

HAL supplies ISRO, the integrated L-40 stages for GSLV Mk II, propellant tanks, feed lines of PSLV, GSLV MKII and GSLV MKIII launch vehicles and structures of various satellites.

Agricultural aircraft 
 HA-31 Basant

Fighter aircraft 

 HF-24 Marut — (retired) Mk.1 and Mk.1T (200+ built)
 HAL HF-73 — (cancelled)
 HAL Ajeet — (retired) a derivative of the British Folland Gnat, 89 built
 Tejas —  Mk.1 (40 in service), Mk.1A (83 on order). 
 Tejas MK2 (MWF) — 4.5+ generation Medium weight fighter (under development) 2023 first flight expected.
 TEDBF — Twin Engine Deck Based Fighter is 4.5+ generation fighter for Indian Navy's aircraft carriers (under development)
 AMCA — Mk.1> 5+ th generation stealth fighter (under development), Mk.2> 6th generation stealth fighter(it will operate in CATS {combat air teaming system}, a UCAV in the swarm will be equipped with a direct energy weapon).

Trainer aircraft 

 HT-2 — First company design to enter production.
 HAL-26 Pushpak — Basic trainer, based on Aeronca Chief
 HPT-32 Deepak — Basic trainer in service for more than three decades.
 HJT-16 Kiran — Mk1, Mk1A and Mk2 - Turbojet trainers scheduled to be replaced with HJT-36 Sitara.
 HTT-34 — Turboprop version of HPT-32 Deepak
 HTT-35 — Proposed replacement for HPT-32 basic trainer in the early 1990s; not pursued
 HJT-36 Sitara — Intermediate jet trainer (under development) 
 HTT-40 — Basic trainer (in production) first prototype flew its first flight on 31 May 2016. (106 ordered)
 HJT 39 / CAT — Advanced jet trainer (proposal)
 HLFT-42- Proposed lead fighter trainer.

Passenger, transport and utility aircraft 

 Saras —  of 14-19 seater capacity multi-purpose civilian light transport aircraft jointly developed with NAL.
 Indian Regional Jet (IRJ) — (under development) of 70-100 seater capacity regional airliner to be jointly developed with NAL.

Helicopters 

 Dhruv — (in production) Advanced light helicopter (350+ built)
 Rudra — (in production) Armed and reconnaissance version of Dhruv (90+ built)
 Prachand — (in production) Light attack helicopter (10+ built)
 Light Utility Helicopter — (in limited series production) Light utility helicopter
 Indian Multi-role Helicopter — (under development) medium multi-role helicopter

Observation and reconnaissance aircraft
 HAOP-27 Krishak — Based on HAL-26 Pushpak

Unmanned Aerial Vehicles 
 PTA Lakshya - Unmanned Aerial Vehicle
 PTA Lakshya 2 - Unmanned Aerial Vehicle (TARGET DRONE)
 Nishant - Unmanned Aerial Vehicle
 Rustom - Unmanned Aerial Vehicle
 TAPAS  - Unmanned Aerial Vehicle (MALE)
 NRUAV
 HAL Combat Air Teaming System (CATS)
 CATS Mothership for Air teaming Exploitation (MAX) - based on Tejas Mark 1A
 CATS Warrior  
 CATS Air Launched Flexible Assets (ALFA) - Unmanned carrier and launcher of weaponized swarm drone ALPHA-S. 
 CATS Hunter - Modular multi-purpose weapon carrying system  
 CATS Infinity - High altitude solar powered atmospheric satellite

Gliders 
 G-1 — HAL's first original design, dating from 1941. Only one was built.
 RG-1 Rohini
 Ardhra — training glider

Engines 

CE-7.5 — cryogenic rocket engine
CE-20 — cryogenic rocket engine
 PTAE-7 — For indigenously designed Lakshya PTA
 GTSU-110 — for starting main engine GE404 or Kaveri of LCA Tejas (under development)
 Shakti — a turboshaft engine for HAL Dhruv Helicopter, co-developed with Safran Helicopter Engines based on Safran Ardiden 1
 GTX-35VS Kaveri — a turbofan engine can be used in HAL-developed Tejas and AMCA, co-developed with GTRE of (DRDO) and Safran Aircraft Engines (under development or initial stage)
 HTFE-25 — a turbofan engine can be used in single engine trainer jets, business jets and UAVs weighing up to 5 tonnes and in twin engine configuration for same weighing up to 9 tonnes (under development)
 HTSE-1200 — a turboshaft engine can be used as engine alternatives for the HAL-developed LUH, Dhruv, Rudra and LCH helicopters (under development)

Divisions 
HAL currently has 11 dedicated Research and Development (R&D) Centers and 21 Manufacturing Divisions under 4 Production Units spread across India.

Research & Design Centres

Design Complex 

 Aircraft Research & Design Centre (ARDC), Bangalore - Design and development of fighter aircrafts
 Aero Engine Research & Design Centre (AERDC), Bangalore - Design and development of Gas turbine engines
 Rotary Wing Research & Design Centre (RWRDC), Bangalore - Design and development of helicopters
 Strategic Electronic Research & Design Centre (SLRDC), Hyderabad - Design and development of communication, radar, mission, navigation and identification systems for aircrafts and helicopters 
 Gas Turbine Research & Design Centre (GTRDC) - Develop modifications, life extension studies, failure analysis of aero-engines and its components
 Aircraft Upgrade Reserch & Design Centre (AURDC), Nasik - Support the license manufacture and overhaul of MiG-21, MiG-27 and SU-30 MKI aircrafts in terms of modifications, repair, rectification and airworthiness certification
 Transport Aircraft Research & Design Centre (TARDC), Kanpur - Role modifications for transport, maritime and intelligence warfare aircraft, integration of mission system and avionics, aircraft upgrades, indigeniosation, damage survey and assessment, development of repair and preventive maintenance technology, cabin furnishing and layout
 Mission and Combat Rearch & Design Centre (MCSRDC), Bangalore - Design and development of mission and combat systems for aircrafts and helicopters 
 Central Materials and Processes Laboratory (CMPL), Bangalore - Material testing and R&D laboratory
 Aerospace Systems and Equipment Research & Design Centre (ASERDC), Lucknow - Applied research, design and development of systems and equipment for aircraft, helicopter and engine
 Aerospace Systems and Equipment Research & Design Centre (ASERDC), Korwa - Design and development of systems and equipment for aircrafts and helicopters

Production Units

Accessories Complex 

 Transport Aircraft Division, Kanpur 
 Accessories Division, Lucknow 
 Avionics Division, Hyderabad 
 Avionics DIvision, Korwa

Bangalore Complex 

 Aircraft Division, Bangalore
 Engine Division, Bangalore
 Overhaul Division, Bangalore
 Foundry & Forge Division, Bangalore
 Aerospace Division, Bangalore
 IMGT Division, Bangalore
 Airport Services Centre, Bangalore
 LCA-Tejas Division, Bangalore

Helicopter Complex 

 Helicopter Division, Bangalore 
 Helicopter MRO Division, Bangalore
 Barrackpore Division
 Aerospace Composites Division

MiG Complex 

 Aircraft Manufacturing Division, Nasik
 Aircraft Overhaul Division, Nasik
 Engine DIvision, Koraput
 Sukhoi Engine Division, Koraput

Licensed production

 Vampire — first combat jet manufactured by HAL, 250+ FB.52, 60 T.55 models
 Harlow PC-5 — first aircraft assembled by HAL
 Percival Prentice — 66 built by HAL
 Mikoyan-Gurevich MiG-21 — FL, M, Bis and Bison upgrades variants 660 built by HAL
 Folland Gnat
 Ajeet — improved version of the Folland Gnat
 Mikoyan-Gurevich MiG-27 — M variant
 SEPECAT Jaguar— IS, IB and IM variants
 BAE Hawk Mk 132 — scheduled production run of 42 aircraft
 Sukhoi Su-30MKI — a derivative of the Sukhoi Su-30
 HS 748 Avro — modified for military usage, includes Series 2M variant with large freight door
 Dornier 228 — 117 built + fuselage, wings and tail unit for production of the upgraded Dornier 228 NG variant
 Aerospatiale SA 315B Lama — HAL Cheetah, Lancer, Cheetal Variants
 Aerospatiale SA 316B Alouette III — HAL Chetak, Chetan Variants
 Rolls-Royce Turbomeca Adour Mk 811 — Engine for SEPECAT Jaguar, produced under license
 Rolls-Royce Turbomeca Adour Mk 871 — Engine for BAE Hawk Mk 132, produced under license
 Garrett TPE331-5 — Engine for Dornier 228, produced under license
 Saturn AL-31FP — Engine for Sukhoi Su-30MKI, produced under license
 Klimov RD-33MK — Engine for Mikoyan MiG-29, produced under license
 Turbomeca TM 333 — Engine for HAL Dhruv Helicopter, produced under license

Notable people
 Kota Harinarayana (b. 1943), president of the Aeronautical Society of India
 Kurt Tank (1898–1983),  German aeronautical engineer, designed Hindustan Marut fighter-bomber
 Roddam Narasimha (1933–2020), aerospace scientist and fluid dinamicist
 Vishnu Madav Ghatage (1908–1991), one of the pioneers of Indian aeronautics

See also

 HAL Aerospace Museum
 Pragati Aerospace Museum
 Defence Research and Development Organisation
 HAL Airport
 Indian Space Research Organisation
 Central Aircraft Manufacturing Company
 Hindustan Aeronautics Limited SC
 National Aerospace Laboratories
 Mahindra Aerospace
 Tata Advanced Systems
 Aeronautical Development Agency

References

External links 

Ready to roll: HAL offers its light combat helicopter to Indian Air Force

Aircraft manufacturers of India
Defence companies of India
Aerospace companies of India
Aircraft engine manufacturers of India
Gas turbine manufacturers
Indian Air Force
Science and technology in Karnataka
Manufacturing companies based in Bangalore
Government-owned companies of India
Walchand Group
Companies nationalised by the Government of India
Technology companies established in 1940
Indian companies established in 1940
Unmanned aerial vehicle manufacturers
Science and technology in Bangalore
Indian brands
Engine manufacturers of India
Companies listed on the National Stock Exchange of India
Companies listed on the Bombay Stock Exchange
Indian companies established in 1963
Indian companies established in 1964